India's Next Top Model, season 4 is the fourth installment of India's Next Top Model. It premiered on MTV India on 6 Oct 2018.

Among with the prizes was a one-year modelling contract with Exceed Entertainment, a portfolio shoot with Dabboo Ratnani, a one-year contract with Viacom 18 and a 5-night stay in Hong Kong by Dream Cruises. Beside, the winner also receive: a Golds Gym VIP membership card worth 100.000Rs, a voucher from Biguine Paris and a gift of Livon Serum.

The winner of the competition was 22 year-old Urvi Shetty from Mumbai.

Contestants 
(Ages stated are at start of contest)

Episodes

Results

 The contestant was eliminated
 The contestant was immune
 The contestant was eliminated outside of judging panel
 The contestant won the competition

 In episode 3 after judging had concluded, Kat entered the competition as a wildcard contestant.
 Episode 11 was a recap episode.
 In episode 9 the first call out order did not reflect their performances.

Photo shoots
Episode 1 runway: Bikini Runway in Pairs (Casting)
Episode 2 photo shoot: Posing around fire with Milind Soman
Episode 3 photo shoot: Posing with Snakes in a Cage in pairs
Episode 4 runway: Mid Air Runway on a 40 feet high ramp
Episode 5 photo shoot: Disco Nights with male models
Episode 6 photo shoot: Posing in Pairs on a rotating wheel
Episode 7 photo shoot and Challenge: "Super Woman" Photoshoot; Bollywood Dance Performances
Episode 8 commercial: Livon Serum Commercial (Self Direction)
Episode 9 runway: Foam Party on a Cruise
Episode 10 photo shoot: Swimsuit in the pool with Malaika Arora

References

External links
Official website

2010s Indian television series
2018 Indian television seasons
Top Model